John Lawrence Taitt (28 March 1934 – 18 October 2006) was a British sprint hurdler. He was born in Georgetown, Demerara-Mahaica, British Guiana (present day Guyana).

Taitt first competed internationally at the 1958 British Empire and Commonwealth Games in Cardiff, Wales. Representing British Guiana, he reached the semi finals of the 120 yards hurdles. Four years later, now representing Great Britain, Taitt reached the semi finals of the 110 metres hurdles at the 1962 European Athletics Championships in Belgrade, Yugoslavia. Two months later representing England, Taitt won the bronze medal in the 120 yards hurdles at the 1962 British Empire and Commonwealth Games in Perth, Western Australia in a time of 14.7 seconds. He was also due to compete in the high jump but pulled out to focus on the hurdles. At the 1964 Summer Olympics in Tokyo, Taitt in the 110 metres hurdles finished fourth in his heat after crossing the line in 14.5 seconds. This was not enough for him to advance to the semi finals. Two years later at the 1966 British Empire and Commonwealth Games in Kingston, Jamaica, Taitt finished fifth in the final of the 120 yards hurdles in a time of 14.3 seconds. At his final major meet, the 1966 European Athletics Championships in Budapest, Hungary, Taitt was unable to make the final of the 110 metres hurdles.

Taitt died on 18 October 2006 in Croydon, Greater London, England at the age of 72.

References

1934 births
2006 deaths
Sportspeople from Georgetown, Guyana
Guyanese emigrants to England
English male hurdlers
Guyanese male hurdlers
Olympic athletes of Great Britain
Commonwealth Games competitors for British Guiana
Commonwealth Games bronze medallists for England
Commonwealth Games medallists in athletics
Athletes (track and field) at the 1964 Summer Olympics
Athletes (track and field) at the 1958 British Empire and Commonwealth Games
Athletes (track and field) at the 1962 British Empire and Commonwealth Games
Athletes (track and field) at the 1966 British Empire and Commonwealth Games
Medallists at the 1962 British Empire and Commonwealth Games